Salvia himmelbaurii is a perennial plant that is found growing on grassy slopes at  elevation in Sichuan province in China. The upper leaf surface is covered with soft hairs, with the underside having hairs especially on the veins.

Notes

himmelbaurii
Flora of China